Lieutenant General Andries Jacob Brink,  (21 July 1877 – 17 October 1947) was a South African military commander. An Afrikaner veteran of the Anglo-Boer War, he joined the Union Defence Forces (UDF) as a staff officer in 1912 and served in the First World War. He was Chief of the General Staff from 1920 to 1933, initially in command only of Defence HQ but, from 1922, of the whole UDF. He was also Secretary for Defence, head of the civil service Department of Defence, from 1922 to 1937. From 1937 to 1946 he was Commandant-in-Chief of the Burger Commandos, a home defence organisation.

Awards and decorations
On 1 January 1944, Lieutenant General Brink was made a Commander of the Order of the British Empire. The notice in the London Gazette reads as follows:

Brink was also awarded the Dekoratie voor Trouwe Dienst and Distinguished Service Order.

References

|-

1877 births
1947 deaths
South African military personnel of World War I
South African civil servants
Afrikaner people
South African people of Dutch descent
Boer military personnel of the Second Boer War
Companions of the Distinguished Service Order
People from Somerset West
South African Commanders of the Order of the British Empire